.32 Short may refer to:

 .32 Short Rimfire, a rimfire pistol cartridge introduced in 1860
 .32 Smith and Wesson, a centerfire pistol cartridge introduced in 1878